In geometry, the problem of dividing a circle into areas by means of an inscribed polygon with n sides in such a way as to maximise the number of areas created by the edges and diagonals, sometimes called Moser's circle problem, has a solution by an inductive method. The greatest possible number of regions, giving the sequence 1, 2, 4, 8, 16, 31, 57, 99, 163, 256, ....

Lemma 

If there are n points on the circle and one more point is added, n lines can be drawn from the new point to previously existing points. Two cases are possible. In the first case (a), the new line passes through a point where two or more old lines (between previously existing points) cross. In the second case (b), the new line crosses each of the old lines in a different point. It will be useful to know the following fact.

Lemma. The new point A can be chosen so that case b occurs for each of the new lines.

Proof. For the case a, three points must be on one line: the new point A, the old point O to which the line is drawn, and the point I where two of the old lines intersect. There are n old points O, and hence finitely many points I where two of the old lines intersect. For each O and I, the line OI crosses the circle in one point other than O.  Since the circle has infinitely many points, it has a point A which will be on none of the lines OI. Then, for this point A and all of the old points O, case b will be true.

This lemma means that, if there are k lines crossing AO, then each of them crosses AO at a different point and k+1 new areas are created by the line AO.

Solution

Inductive method 

The lemma establishes an important property for solving the problem. By employing an inductive proof, one can arrive at a formula for f(n) in terms of f(n − 1).

In the figure the dark lines are connecting points 1 through 4 dividing the circle into 8 total regions (i.e., f(4) = 8).  This figure illustrates the inductive step from n = 4 to n = 5 with the dashed lines.  When the fifth point is added (i.e., when computing f(5) using f(4)), this results in four new lines (the dashed lines in the diagram) being added, numbered 1 through 4, one for each point that they connect to. The number of new regions introduced by the fifth point can therefore be determined by considering the number of regions added by each of the 4 lines.  Set i to count the lines being added. Each new line can cross a number of existing lines, depending on which point it is to (the value of i).  The new lines will never cross each other, except at the new point.

The number of lines that each new line intersects can be determined by considering the number of points on the "left" of the line and the number of points on the "right" of the line.  Since all existing points already have lines between them, the number of points on the left multiplied by the number of points on the right is the number of lines that will be crossing the new line.  For the line to point i, there are

n − i  − 1

points on the left and

i − 1 points

on the right, so
a total of

 (n  − i  − 1) (i  − 1)

lines must be crossed.

In this example, the lines to i = 1 and i = 4 each cross zero lines,
while the lines to i = 2  and i = 3 each cross two lines (there are two
points on one side and one on the other).

So the recurrence can be expressed as

which can be easily reduced to

using the sums of the first  natural numbers and the first  squares, this combines to

Finally

 with 

which yields

Combinatorics and topology method 

The lemma asserts that the number of regions is maximal if all "inner" intersections of chords are simple (exactly two chords pass through each point of intersection in the interior). This will be the case if the points on the circle are chosen "in general position". Under this assumption of "generic intersection", the number of regions can also be determined in a non-inductive way, using the formula for the Euler characteristic of a connected planar graph (viewed here as a graph embedded in the 2-sphere S 2).

A planar graph determines a cell decomposition of the plane with F faces (2-dimensional cells), E edges (1-dimensional cells) and V vertices (0-dimensional cells). As the graph is connected, the Euler relation for the 2-dimensional sphere S 2 

holds. View the diagram (the circle together with all the chords) above as a planar graph. If the general formulas for V and E can both be found, the formula for F can also be derived, which will solve the problem.

Its vertices include the n points on the circle, referred to as the exterior vertices, as well as the interior vertices, the intersections of distinct chords in the interior of the circle. The "generic intersection" assumption made above guarantees that each interior vertex is the intersection of no more than two chords.

Thus the main task in determining V is finding the number of interior vertices. As a consequence of the lemma, any two intersecting chords will uniquely determine an interior vertex. These chords are in turn uniquely determined by the four corresponding endpoints of the chords, which are all exterior vertices. Any four exterior vertices determine a cyclic quadrilateral, and all cyclic quadrilaterals are convex quadrilaterals, so each set of four exterior vertices have exactly one point of intersection formed by their diagonals (chords). Further, by definition all interior vertices are formed by intersecting chords.

Therefore each interior vertex is uniquely determined by a combination of four exterior vertices, where the number of interior vertices is given by

and so

The edges include the n circular arcs connecting pairs of adjacent exterior vertices, as well as the chordal line segments (described below) created inside the circle by the collection of chords. Since there are two groups of vertices: exterior and interior, the chordal line segments can be further categorized into three groups:
 Edges directly (not cut by other chords) connecting two exterior vertices. These are chords between adjacent exterior vertices, and form the perimeter of the polygon. There are n such edges.
 Edges connecting two interior vertices.
 Edges connecting an interior and exterior vertex.

To find the number of edges in groups 2 and 3, consider each interior vertex, which is connected to exactly four edges. This yields

edges. Since each edge is defined by two endpoint vertices, only the interior vertices were enumerated, group 2 edges are counted twice while group 3 edges are counted once only.

Every chord that is cut by another (i.e., chords not in group 1) must contain two group 3 edges, its beginning and ending chordal segments. As chords are uniquely determined by two exterior vertices, there are altogether

group 3 edges. This is twice the total number of chords that are not themselves members of group 1.

The sum of these results divided by two gives the combined number of edges in groups 2 and 3. Adding the n edges from group 1, and the n circular arc edges brings the total to

Substituting V and E into the Euler relation solved for F,  one then obtains

Since one of these faces is the exterior of the circle, the number of regions rG inside the circle is F − 1, or

which resolves to

which yields the same quartic polynomial obtained by using the inductive method

The fifth column of Bernoulli's triangle (k = 4) gives the maximum number of regions in the problem of dividing a circle into areas for n + 1 points, where n ≥ 4.

Application to mathematical billiards inside the circle

Considering the force-free motion of a particle inside a circle it was shown (see D. Jaud) that for specific reflection angles along the circle boundary the associated area division sequence is given by an arithmetic series.

See also
Lazy caterer's sequence – where n is the number of straight cuts

References

Conway, J. H. and Guy, R. K. "How Many Regions." In The Book of Numbers. New York: Springer-Verlag, pp. 76–79, 1996.
 
 http://www.arbelos.co.uk/Papers/Chords-regions.pdf 
Jaud, D "Integer Sequences from Circle Divisions by Rational Billiard Trajectories". In "ICGG 2022 - Proceedings of the 20th International Conference on Geometry and Graphics", DOI: 10.1007/978-3-031-13588-0_8
Combinatorics
Circles
Area